Kitchel is a surname. Notable people with the surname include:

 Cornelius P. Kitchel (1875–1947), former mayor of Englewood, New Jersey
 Denison Kitchel (1908–2002), campaign manager of Barry M. Goldwater
 Harvey Denison Kitchel (1812–1895), former president of Middlebury College
 Jane Kitchel (born 1945), member of the Vermont Senate
 Ted Kitchel (born 1959), basketball player

See also
 Kitchel, Indiana, an unincorporated community in Union County
 Kitchell, surname